The Citizens State Bank of Gillett is located in Gillett, Wisconsin. It was added to the National Register of Historic Places in 2008.

History
The bank was the first building in its community constructed solely for financial purposes. A victim of the Great Depression, the bank closed in 1932. The building now houses a dental practice.

References

Bank buildings on the National Register of Historic Places in Wisconsin
Buildings and structures in Oconto County, Wisconsin
Commercial buildings completed in 1904
National Register of Historic Places in Oconto County, Wisconsin